Line 4 of Qingdao Metro is a rapid transit line in Qingdao, Shandong, China. The line opened on 26 December 2022.

Opening timeline

Stations

References

Qingdao Metro lines
Railway lines opened in 2022